Kosinova is feminine counterpart of a Russian surname Kosinov. Notable people with the surname include:

 Larisa Valeryevna Kosinova, Russian sinologist, pedagogue (Volgograd State Pedagogical University)
 Mariya Valeryevna Kosinova (born 1984), Russian biathlete
 Natalya Nikolayevna Kosinova, Russian economist, member of the Russian Academy of Natural Sciences

 Also
 Kosinova, Kursk Oblast, a village in Oktyabrsky District of Kursk Oblast

 See also
 Karolína Kosinová (born 1998), a Czech ice hockey player

Russian-language surnames